Nowe Dobki  is a village in the administrative district of Gmina Czerwin, within Ostrołęka County, Masovian Voivodeship, in east-central Poland. As of 2011, it had a population of 28.

References

Nowe Dobki